Brendan Oliver Foley (born 6 August 1950) is an Irish former rugby union player, who played in the amateur era of the sport. He played primarily as a lock. Foley is the father of two Ireland rugby internationals Anthony Foley (1973–2016) and Rosie Foley.

Early life
Foley was born in Limerick and was a student at St. Mary's CBS in the city. He initially played for the Saints' team at club level for a short time, but switched to Shannon where he spent the rest of his senior club career.

Rugby career

Shannon
Foley played for Shannon throughout the 1970s and into the 1980s during which time Shannon became a force in Munster rugby and aimed to challenge Garryowen, the most successful club in Munster club history and create a classic rivalry that continues to this day. Shannon won the Munster Senior Cup in the 1976–77, 1977–78 and 1981–82 seasons.

Munster
Foley played for Munster in many famous games. An "outstanding performance" in a narrow defeat against a touring  in 1976 earned him his first ever cap for  two weeks later. By coincidence, he also played in the Munster side that beat Australia in 1981 just a week before his final appearance for Ireland. His best known appearance for Munster however, came when they famously beat  on 31 October 1978, with Foley playing alongside his Shannon club mates Colm Tucker and Gerry McLoughlin in the side.

Ireland
Foley made his debut for  against  in Parc des Princes on 7 February 1976, on the back of a strong performance for Munster against  two weeks previously. He went on to play 11 times for Ireland, with eight of these appearances coming in the Five Nations Championship. Foley made his last international appearance on 21 November 1981 against Australia in Lansdowne Road.

References

1950 births
Living people
Irish rugby union players
Munster Rugby players
Shannon RFC players
Rugby union locks
Rugby union players from County Limerick
Ireland international rugby union players